Bagh-e Alishir (also Romanized as Bāgh-e ‘Alīshīr and Bāgh Alishir; also known as Baghal Shīr and Bāgh-i-‘Ali) is a village in Sarduiyeh Rural District, Sarduiyeh District, Jiroft County, Kerman Province, Iran. At the 2006 census, its population was 418, in 96 families.

References 

Populated places in Jiroft County